Edgar Fernandes (born 12 April 1938) is a Kenyan field hockey player. He competed at the 1960 and the 1964 Summer Olympics. He is the brother of Kenyan hockey international Egbert Fernandes.

References

External links
 

1938 births
Living people
Kenyan male field hockey players
Olympic field hockey players of Kenya
Field hockey players at the 1960 Summer Olympics
Field hockey players at the 1964 Summer Olympics
People from Kisumu County
Kenyan people of Indian descent
Kenyan people of Goan descent
20th-century Kenyan people